Roberto Bautista Agut (born 14 April 1988) is a Spanish professional tennis player. He has been ranked as high as world No. 9 by the Association of Tennis Professionals (ATP) in singles, which he first achieved on 4 November 2019.

Bautista Agut has won eleven ATP singles titles out of twenty one  finals, the biggest win being the 2018 Dubai Tennis Championships, an ATP 500 tournament. His biggest final has been the 2016 Shanghai Masters, where he lost to Andy Murray. His best result at a major has been at the 2019 Wimbledon Championships, where he reached the semifinals.

Tennis career

Juniors
As a junior, Bautista Agut compiled a singles win–loss record of 41–13, reaching as high as No. 47 in junior world rankings in July 2006.

2009–2012: Pro tour highlights
In 2009, Bautista Agut qualified for the ATP 500 tournament in Valencia, where he lost to Albert Montañés in the first round.

He qualified for his first Grand Slam appearance in the 2012 Australian Open. He lost in the first round to Ricardo Mello in straight sets. On 13 August 2012, Bautista Agut broke into the top 100 for the first time after strong performances in Challenger tournaments. He reached his first ATP-level quarterfinal at St. Petersburg later that year, losing to Fabio Fognini.

2013: First final

His first tournament of 2013, in Chennai, saw him reach his first career ATP final. Bautista Agut defeated world No. 6, Tomáš Berdych, in the quarterfinals in three sets and faced world No. 9, Janko Tipsarević, in the final, to whom he lost despite winning the first set.

Bautista Agut then followed with his then career-best Grand Slam performance at the Australian Open. After defeating Fabio Fognini in a first round five-setter, he fell to Jürgen Melzer in the second round.

At Roland Garros, he reached the third round, after failing to even qualify at the main event for three consecutive occasions. His run ended to local Jérémy Chardy.

At the Topshelf Open, Bautista Agut went through to the quarterfinals, before losing to Xavier Malisse.

At the Wimbledon, he went on to make another second-round appearance after defeating Russian qualifier Teymuraz Gabashvili in the first round. However, he fell to his childhood idol, David Ferrer, in the second round, losing in four sets.

Bautista Agut then took part at the Mercedes Cup in Stuttgart. He made it to the semifinal where he lost to eventual champion Fabio Fognini.
On 15 July, Bautista Agut broke the top 50 for the first time.

At the US Open, he achieved another second round finish. After beating Thomaz Bellucci in the first round, he faced Ferrer in the second, where Bautista Agut lost in four sets.

He finished the year with a quarterfinal appearance at the St. Petersburg Open, defeated by eventual champion Ernests Gulbis.

Bautista Agut finished the 2013 season ranked No. 58.

2014: First two titles and top 15
His 2014 campaign began in Auckland, where he made the semifinals of the Heineken Open. He lost to third seed and eventual champion John Isner after winning the first set.

Bautista Agut started at the Australian Open with a first-round victory over Tim Smyczek. In the second, he faced and upset world No. 5 Juan Martín del Potro in five sets, his first victory against a top-ten player.

These surprising performances earned him a call-up to Spain for their clash with Germany in the Davis Cup. Bautista Agut lost both of his rubbers to Philipp Kohlschreiber and Daniel Brands. Germany won the tie 4–1.

In March, Bautista Agut participated in the first Masters 1000 event of the year at Indian Wells. In the second round, he faced Tomáš Berdych and achieved his second top-ten win of the year, winning in three sets after losing the first. His tournament ended in the fourth round with a defeat to Ernests Gulbis.

In May, Roberto participated in the Madrid Masters. He made it to the tournament's semifinals after beating former top-ten players, Tommy Robredo, Fernando Verdasco, and an in-form Barcelona finalist Santiago Giraldo en route to this stage. In the semifinal, Bautista Agut was defeated by world No. 1, Rafael Nadal.

Roberto then played in the French Open. This was his first Grand Slam tournament where he was one of the top 32 seeded players, seeded 27th. Bautista Agut beat Paolo Lorenzi, and Frenchman Benoît Paire but he was unable to beat world No. 6 Tomáš Berdych, ending his tournament in the third round after a four-set defeat.

In preparation for Wimbledon, he played in the Topshelf Open, a grass-court tournament in 's-Hertogenbosch, as the third seed. Bautista Agut won his first ATP title there, defeating former champion Benjamin Becker in the final in three sets.

He then played in the Wimbledon Championships. After defeating Steve Johnson and Jan Hernych, his run ended at the hands of the defending champion Andy Murray in the third round.

He went back to playing on clay courts as the third seed in the Mercedes Cup in Stuttgart. In the semifinal, Bautista Agut recorded an upset, beating defending champion Fabio Fognini for the second time in his career. This result led him to take on Lukáš Rosol in the final, his third professional ATP tournament final. Bautista Agut won in three sets, claiming his second 250-level title.

In the US Open, Bautista Agut reached the fourth round, after defeating Andreas Haider-Maurer, Tim Smyczek, and Adrian Mannarino on the way to taking on the No. 2 seed Roger Federer. He lost in straight sets. This was his best ever US Open campaign and he equaled his best career Grand Slam result (2014 Australian Open).

Bautista Agut went to Russia to play in the Kremlin Cup tournament held in Moscow. He advanced to the final where he took on the 2014 US Open champion, Marin Čilić, in the final. His tournament ended with a tight straight-set defeat.

After his outstanding season, Bautista Agut won the ATP's Most Improved Player award.

At the end of the best season in his career so far, he finished 2014 with a singles ranking of world No. 15, and a doubles ranking of No. 255.

2015: Wimbledon fourth round
Bautista Agut began his new season, as the third seed, in the Aircel Chennai Open. He progressed to the semifinal where he lost to British qualifier Aljaž Bedene.

In February, Bautista Agut traveled to France to play in the Open 13 tournament in Marseille. His tournament ended in the semifinals against local Gaël Monfils.

In April, Bautista Agut travelled to Spain to play on the clay courts at the Barcelona Open. He made it to the quarterfinals where he was defeated in a tight three-setter by defending champion Kei Nishikori.

Later that month, he travelled to Germany to play in the BMW Open in Munich. Bautista Agut progressed to the semifinals where he lost to top seed Andy Murray.

One month later, he travelled to England to play in the year's third major. Bautista Agut was the 20th seed in Wimbledon, and advanced to the fourth round to take on seven-time Wimbledon champion and tournament second seed, Roger Federer, after wins over Ruben Bemelmans, Benoît Paire, and Nikoloz Basilashvili but lost in straight sets.

In July, he played as the second seed in the Croatia Open and advanced to the semifinals where he was defeated by João Sousa.

In September, Bautista Agut was the 23rd seed in the US Open. After victories over Pierre-Hugues Herbert, Pablo Carreño Busta, and David Goffin, he reached the fourth round of a major for a second consecutive time. He took on the world number one, Novak Djokovic, losing in a four-set defeat. However, Bautista Agut had managed to repeat his best performance in New York for a second consecutive year.

He then played in the St. Petersburg Open where he was the fourth seed. He lost in the semifinals to second seed Miloš Raonić.

He was the second seed in the Kremlin Cup, and in a repeat of the previous years final, Bautista Agut lost against Marin Čilić by the same scoreline (4–6, 4–6).

He was the seventh seed in the Valencia Open. With most of the seeds falling early, it was a shock draw with Bautista Agut being the only seeded player remaining by the semifinals. Bautista Agut reached the final where he led by a set and a break against João Sousa but failed to consolidate, going on to lose the match, which was the trend of his 2015 season in decisive matches.

At the end of 2015, he finished outside the top 20 with a ranking of 25.

2016: Inaugural Sofia champion, back to top 15, first Masters final
In the ASB Classic, Bautista Agut knocked out defending Champion Jiri Vesely, third seeded American John Isner and second seeded Frenchman Jo-Wilfried Tsonga, his first top-ten scalp in two years, on his way to the final where he took on talented American Jack Sock. He was crowned champion after the American retired in the second set.

In the Australian Open Bautista Agut was seeded 24th. After defeating Martin Kližan and Dušan Lajović, he took on 12th seed Marin Čilić in the third round. He earned his first ever win over Čilić in a shock straight-sets result setting up a match-up with the sixth seed, Tomáš Berdych. Bautista Agut lost in a tough five setter, denying him a chance at his first Grand Slam quarterfinal.

His first tournament after the Australian Open was the Garanti Koza Sofia Open based in Bulgaria. Bautista Agut was the top seed and made it all the way to the final where he took on Serbian second seed Viktor Troicki. He won the match and became the inaugural Garanti Koza Sofia Open champion. This was his fourth career title and second title in 2016.

In May, Bautista Agut played in the year's second major as the 14th seed. He reached the fourth round of the French Open after he defeated Dmitry Tursunov, Paul-Henri Mathieu, and Borna Ćorić. His quest for a place in a Grand Slam quarterfinal was again ended by a top-ten player, this time by world number one, Novak Djokovic. This result was his best result at the French Open and equals his best at Grand Slam level.

In early August, Bautista Agut was a representative for Spain at the Olympic Games. He advanced to the quarterfinals in Rio de Janeiro after beating Andrey Kuznetsov, Paolo Lorenzi, and Gilles Müller in the earlier rounds. His quest for an Olympic medal ended after a defeat against the eventual silver-medalist Juan Martín del Potro.

Later that month, Bautista Agut reached the final of the Winston-Salem Open in which he lost to compatriot Pablo Carreño Busta in three sets.

In the penultimate Masters 1000 event of the year, the Shanghai Masters, Bautista Agut made it to his first Masters-1000 final, defeating Bernard Tomic (who was forced to retire because of abdominal pain), qualifier Taylor Fritz, Viktor Troicki, 2015 finalist Jo-Wilfried Tsonga, and top seed and defending champion Novak Djoković. This was the first time in his career he had beaten Djokovic and the first time he had defeated a world No. 1 player. In the final, he lost to Andy Murray in straight sets.

Bautista Agut finished 2016 ranked No. 14 in the world.

2017: Two 250 titles
He began his 2017 season in Chennai where he made it all the way to the final. In the final, Bautista Agut beat Daniil Medvedev in straight sets, securing his fifth career title.

At the Wimbledon Championships, Bautista Agut was the 18th seed. He went on to beat Andreas Haider-Maurer, and Peter Gojowczyk, on his way to a third round meeting with ninth seed Kei Nishikori. Bautista Agut caused an upset beating Nishikori for the first time and claiming his seventh top-ten scalp of his career. However, he wasn't able to win back to back top-ten victories, after succumbing to a straight-sets defeat against Marin Čilić in the fourth round.

In the Rogers Cup, Bautista Agut demonstrated his best Masters 1000 performance for the year. After winning his first two matches, he took on Gaël Monfils in the third round. After losing the first set, Bautista Agut was able to secure an unlikely victory, securing his first win over the Frenchman in three tight sets. However, he then was unable to break his winless drought against Roger Federer, in the quarterfinals, losing in straight-sets.

A couple of weeks later, Bautista Agut took part in the Winston-Salem Open. He won all of his matches, without dropping a set, to win his second 250 title of the year, and sixth of his career.

Bautista Agut finished the year ranked No. 20 in the world.

2018: Dubai Champion
In Auckland, he made it to his 13th ATP final appearance. In the final, Bautista Agut took on second seed Juan Martín del Potro, who had yet to drop a set in the tournament. He went on to beat his opponent in three sets, clinching his second Auckland title, and ending a three-match losing streak against the tall Argentine.

Bautista Agut lost in the first round of the Australian Open, meaning that his streak of ten consecutive third round appearances in majors came to an end. It was also his first loss in the opening round of a major since the end of the 2012 season, marking 20 consecutive majors where he won his opening match.

In March, he won his biggest title yet in the ATP 500 tournament in Dubai, losing only one set along the way and beating in-form Lucas Pouille in the final. Bautista Agut also became the first player outside the top ten, to win the event since Fabrice Santoro in 2002.

He finished the year ranked No. 24 in the world.

2019: Wimbledon semifinal, top 10, Davis Cup title
Bautista Agut opened his season as the seventh seed at the Qatar Open. He defeated Matteo Berrettini, qualifier Guillermo García López, and three-time major champion Stan Wawrinka before facing world number one Novak Djokovic in the semifinals, whom he defeated in three close sets. In the final, he prevailed over veteran Tomáš Berdych to claim the title.

At the Australian Open, he first faced former world number one and five-time Australia Open finalist Andy Murray, defeating him in a grueling five-set contest. In the second round, Bautista Agut defeated John Millman in another five-setter. In the third, he prevailed over tenth seed Karen Khachanov in straight sets to reach the fourth round of a Grand Slam event for the tenth time in his career. He reached his first Grand Slam quarterfinal, after he defeated the sixth-seed Marin Čilić, in five sets. In the quarterfinals, he was defeated by 14th seed Stefanos Tsitsipas, who was fresh off a victory over defending champion Roger Federer, in four sets. With this performance, he earned enough points to re-enter the top 20 in the ATP rankings.

Bautista Agut beat top seed Djokovic yet again at the Miami Masters. At Wimbledon, he reached his second major quarterfinal after victories over Peter Gojowczyk, Steve Darcis, world No. 9 Karen Khachanov, and Benoît Paire. He was the only player in the draw not to lose a set leading into the quarterfinals. Despite losing his first set in the quarterfinals, Bautista Agut defeated Guido Pella in four sets to reach his first Grand Slam semifinal. However, he was defeated by Djokovic in four sets.

Following back to back quarterfinal appearances at the Montreal and Cincinnati Masters events, he broke into the world's top ten for the first time in his career.

2020: Inaugural ATP Cup finalist, Masters semifinal, 300th career win
Bautista Agut started the year with the 2020 Australian Open as the 9th seed, where he beat Feliciano Lopez and Michael Mmoh before losing to Marin Cilic in five sets in the third round, a rematch of the 2019 fourth round match. He lost in the second round at Rotterdam to Pablo Carreno Busta and in the first round in Dubai to Jan-Lennard Struff.

Seeded 8th at the Cincinnati Masters, he reached the semifinals, beating 11th seed Karen Khachanov and 3rd seed Daniil Medvedev before losing to top seed Novak Djokovic in three sets.

At the 2020 US Open, Bautista Agut was also seeded 8th. He beat Tennys Sandgren for his 300th career win and Miomir Kecmanovic before being upset in the third round by Canadian Vasek Pospisil.

2021: Two finals, Wimbledon fourth round
Bautista Agut made two finals in the early hardcourt season in Montpellier and Doha, where he was defeated by David Goffin and Nikoloz Basilashvili respectively. To reach the final in Doha, Bautista Agut beat two top ten players, Dominic Thiem and Andrey Rublev. This marked the first time where he defeated two top-ten players in a single tournament.

Seeded 8th, he reached the fourth round at the 2021 Wimbledon Championships defeating John Millman, Miomir Kecmanović and Dominik Koepfer before losing to eventual semifinalist Denis Shapovalov.

2022: Second ATP Cup Final, 350th career win, 10th & 11th titles 
Bautista Agut has played a pivotal role in Spain's 2022 ATP Cup journey, by winning all of his three singles matches in the group stage. He then beat Hubert Hurkacz of Poland in the semi finals in 3 sets to lead Spain into the final. In the final, Bautista Agut suffered the decisive loss to Félix Auger-Aliassime as Team Canada won the title.

Bautista Agut reached the final of the 2022 Qatar ExxonMobil Open in Doha again to set a rematch with Nikoloz Basilashvili. He won the Doha title for the second time and his tenth in his career. Also in February he recorded his 350th win at the 2022 Dubai Tennis Championships.

At the 2022 Generali Open Kitzbühel he won his eleventh title defeating wildcard debutant Filip Misolic.

At the 2022 Astana Open he defeated eight seed Felix Auger-Aliassime and lucky loser Pavel Kotov to reach the quarterfinals.

2023: Adelaide finalist, out of top 25
Bautista Agut started his season at the Adelaide International 1. He upset fourth seed and world No. 8, Andrey Rublev, in the first round. He lost in the second round to eventual finalist Sebastian Korda. Seeded fourth at the Adelaide International 2, He beat seventh seed and compatriot, Alejandro Davidovich Fokina, in the quarterfinals and last year’s champion and home favorite, Thanasi Kokkinakis, in the semifinals to reach his first final of the season. He was defeated in the final by lucky loser, Kwon Soon-woo, in three sets.

Playing style 
Bautista Agut is a counterpuncher with a decent all-around game. He is able to play offensively with his forehand but thrives off his defensive ability with his consistency and quickness around the court. He has a clean flat strike on both sides and his game is better suited for hard courts (as compared to many of his Spanish compatriots). On the forehand, which is by far his primary weapon, he uses close to an Eastern which allows him a flat hit (instead of the whipping spin hit by Nadal). His backhand is easily the weaker wing and the side opponents look to target. His serve lacks pace but can create decent angles and slice.

He is known for his "no-frills" style of play grounded in consistency and precision, rather than pure power and shotmaking. However, the lack of variety in his game could also be considered a weakness.

Personal life
Roberto's nickname is "Bati". His father, Joaquín, a former football player and a banker, died in November 2019 during the Davis Cup tournament; his mother, Ester, who died unexpectedly in May 2018, owned a clothing store in Castellón de la Plana. Bautista Agut started playing tennis at the age of five when his mother signed him up to play on the weekends. His favourite shot is his forehand. His idols growing up were Juan Carlos Ferrero and David Ferrer.

Beyond tennis, he enjoys horseback riding (he owns seven horses) and playing various sports. He played football for Villarreal C.F. until he was 14 when he decided to focus on his tennis career.

Bautista Agut is married to Ana Bodí Tortosa. The couple were married on 30 November 2019. Their first child, a boy, also named Roberto, was born in September 2020.

Performance timelines
{{Performance key|short=yes}}

Singles
Current through the 2023 Australian Open.

ATP Masters 1000 tournaments

Singles: 1 (1 runner up)

ATP career finals

Singles: 22 (11 titles, 11 runner-ups)

National representation

Challenger and Futures finals

Singles: 20 (13–7)

Doubles: 2 (0–2)

Record against other players

Wins over top 10 players
 Bautista Agut has a  record against players who were ranked in the top 10 at the time the match was played.

See also 

 Spain Davis Cup team
 List of Spain Davis Cup team representatives
Tennis in Spain
Sport in Spain

Notes

References

External links

 
 
 
 

1988 births
Living people
Sportspeople from Castellón de la Plana
Spanish male tennis players
Tennis players from the Valencian Community
Olympic tennis players of Spain
Tennis players at the 2016 Summer Olympics
Mediterranean Games gold medalists for Spain
Mediterranean Games bronze medalists for Spain
Competitors at the 2009 Mediterranean Games
Mediterranean Games medalists in tennis